Bryan Bresee (born October 6, 2001) is an American football defensive tackle for the Clemson Tigers. He was the 2020 ACC Defensive Rookie of the Year.

High school career 
Bresee played football at Urbana High School in Frederick, Maryland before transferring to Damascus High School in Damascus, Maryland. In both 2017 and 2019, he helped lead Damascus to state championship victories. Bresee was a five-star recruit coming out of high school. He committed to Clemson, turning down offers from Penn State, Alabama, Georgia, and Ohio State. He was named to the All-American Bowl following his senior season.

References

External links
 
 Clemson Tigers bio

2001 births
Living people
Players of American football from Maryland
Sportspeople from Montgomery County, Maryland
American football defensive tackles
Clemson Tigers football players
People from Damascus, Maryland